The Fifth Legislative Assembly of the Wisconsin Territory convened from , to , and from , to , in regular session.  The Assembly also convened in special session from October 18, 1847, to October 27, 1847, to organize a second constitutional convention after the failure to adopt the first Wisconsin Constitution.

During this Assembly term, Wisconsin was attempting to achieve statehood. A constitution was drafted at a convention in the Fall of 1846 and was put to the voters at the spring election held April 6, 1847.  The voters overwhelmingly rejected this document.  New delegates were elected at a special election held November 29, 1847, and a new constitution was drafted that Winter.  The new constitution was approved by the voters on March 13, 1848.

Major events
 March 29, 1847: United States forces under General Winfield Scott took Veracruz after a siege.
 April 6, 1847: Wisconsin Territory voters rejected the 1st Constitution of Wisconsin.
 September 14, 1847: United States forces under General Winfield Scott entered Mexico City, marking the end of organized Mexican resistance.
 December 15, 1847February 1, 1848: The second Wisconsin constitutional convention was held in Madison, Wisconsin Territory.
 January 24, 1848: James W. Marshall found gold at Sutter's Mill, in Coloma, California, setting off the California Gold Rush.
 January 31, 1848: Construction of the Washington Monument began in Washington, D.C.
 February 2, 1848: The Treaty of Guadalupe Hidalgo ended the Mexican–American War.
 February 22February 24, 1848: Riots in Paris forced the abdication of King Louis Philippe I and the resignation of Prime Minister François Guizot in the French Revolution of 1848.
 March 13, 1848: Wisconsin Territory voters ratified the 2nd Constitution of Wisconsin.
 March 15, 1848: Mass protests in Pest forced the Austrian Empire to accept Hungarian claims of self-determination in the Hungarian Revolution of 1848.
 March 18, 1848: Hundreds were killed in a protest in Berlin associated with the German revolutions of 1848–1849.
 May 29, 1848: Wisconsin was admitted to the United States as the 30th U.S. state.

Major legislation
 January 14, 1847: An Act to incorporate the Lawrence Institute of Wisconsin.
 February 4, 1847: An Act to incorporate the Nashotah House.
 October 27, 1847: An Act in relation to the formation of a State Government in Wisconsin, and to change the time for holding the annual session of the Legislature.

Sessions
 1st session: January 4, 1847February 11, 1847
 Special session: October 18, 1847October 27, 1847
 2nd session: February 7, 1848March 13, 1848

Leadership

Council President
 Horatio Wells (D) – during all three sessions

Speaker of the House of Representatives
 William Shew (D) – during 1st session
 Isaac P. Walker (D) – during the special session
 Timothy Burns (D) – during 2nd session

Members

Members of the Council
Members of the Council for the Fifth Wisconsin Territorial Assembly:

Members of the House of Representatives
Members of the House of Representatives for the Fifth Wisconsin Territorial Assembly:

Employees

Council employees
 Secretary:
 Thomas McHugh, all sessions
 Sergeant-at-Arms:
 John Bevins, 1st session
 Edward P. Lockhart, special & 2nd sessions

House employees
 Chief Clerk:
 La Fayette Kellogg, all sessions
 Sergeant-at-Arms:
 E. R. Hugunin, 1st & special sessions
 John Mullanphy, 2nd session

Notes

References

External links
 Wisconsin Legislature website

1846 in Wisconsin Territory
1847 in Wisconsin Territory
1848 in Wisconsin
1840s in Wisconsin
Wisconsin
Wisconsin
Wisconsin
Wisconsin legislative sessions